The Hertling cabinet was the first cabinet of the German Empire that came about after consulting with the majority parties in the Reichstag. The Social Democrats did not join the cabinet, not wanting to render the process of forming a government even more difficult. 

Hertling belonged to the right wing of the Catholic Centre Party, and was against a parliamentarisation of the German Empire. The left wing around Matthias Erzberger took the opposite view, and the broad centre of the party wanted to take into account the views of the right wing, but also took note of the wishes of Catholic workers for democratisation. The centre did not want to put obstacles in the way of parliamentarisation, but did not take active steps to prevent a split in the party. Hertling's chancellorship meant that the Centre and the left Liberals took account of the conservative elements. The latter could thus get used to a parliamentary way of governing.

Further reading 
 Regenten und Regierungen der Welt, Vols 2,3. Neueste Zeit: 1492–1917, ed. by B. Spuler; 2. edition, Würzburg, Ploetz, 1962.

References 

Historic German cabinets
1917 establishments in Germany
1918 disestablishments in Germany
Cabinets established in 1917
Cabinets disestablished in 1918